Delilah is the sixth studio album by Welsh singer Tom Jones. Released in 1968, it became his first album to reach number one on the UK Albums Chart, spending two weeks at the top of the chart.

Track listing
Side one
"Delilah" (Barry Mason, Les Reed) – 3:26
"Weeping Annaleah" (Mickey Newbury, Dan Folger) – 3:26
"One Day Soon" (Francis Lai, Don Black) – 2:39
"Laura" (Leon Ashley, Margie Singleton) – 3:25
"Make This Heart of Mine Smile Again" (Sol Parker, Kelly Owens) – 2:39
"Lingering On" (Scott English, Stanley J. Gelber, James Last) – 3:15

Side two
"You Can't Stop Love" (Gordon Mills, Les Reed) – 3:05
"My Elusive Dreams" (Curly Putman, Billy Sherrill) – 3:18
"Just Out of Reach (Of My Two Open Arms)" (Virgil F. Stewart) – 2:44
"Only a Fool Breaks His Own Heart" (Shelly Coburn, Norman Bergen) – 2:35
"Why Can't I Cry" (Johnny Harris, Kim Clarke) – 3:10
"Take Me" (George Jones, Leon Payne) – 3:12

Personnel
Peter Sullivan - producer
Bill Price - engineer

References

1968 albums
Tom Jones (singer) albums
Decca Records albums
Albums produced by Peter Sullivan (record producer)